The gold metal of the Generalitat of Catalonia is the highest award given by the Generalitat of Catalonia to those people or institutions who have excelled with their work in the political, social, economic, cultural or scientific, and raised awareness of Catalan cultural heritage. Together with the Creu de Sant Jordi and Premi Internacional Catalunya is one of the highest civil awards in Catalonia.

List of awarded

References

Catalan culture
Catalan awards
Orders, decorations, and medals of country subdivisions